Pál Székely (born 14 November 1972) is a Hungarian darts player, four times Hungarian steel darts champion and the first professional darts player of Hungary.

In 2019, he made his PDC European Tour debut in the 2019 Dutch Darts Masters, but lost 6–1 to Raymond van Barneveld. A few weeks later, Székely will make his television debut in the 2019 PDC World Cup of Darts, partnering János Végső. Szekely have the nickname The Blade.

References

External links

1972 births
Living people
Hungarian darts players
Professional Darts Corporation associate players
PDC World Cup of Darts Hungarian team